Between River and Sea: Encounters in Israel and Palestine is a book by Irish author Dervla Murphy. It was first published by Eland Books in 2015. It was Murphy's final book before her death in 2022.

Summary
Between River and Sea describes Murphy's journeys into Israel and Palestine, talking with whoever she meets in Haifa, in the settlements and in a refugee camp on the West Bank. It was her second book on Palestine, following on from A Month by the Sea, but she destroyed the material for a third book based on visits to the Palestinian refugee camps in Jordan for fear that it might endanger their lives.

References

External links
 

2015 non-fiction books
Eland Books books
Books by Dervla Murphy